KGBA (1490 kHz) is an AM radio station licensed to Heber, California, and serving the Imperial Valley as well as Mexicali, Baja California, Mexico.  The station is owned by The Voice of International Christian Evangelism, Inc.  It airs a Spanish-language Christian radio format.

KGBA has an FM counterpart, 100.1 KGBA-FM in Holtville.  It airs an English-language Christian radio format.  Both stations depend on listeners sending in donations to support the radio ministries heard on the stations.

History
The station signed on as KICO in 1947.  It was originally licensed to Calexico and was only powered at 250 watts.  KICO was owned by Charles Love, who also served as the General Manager.

It changed its call sign to KGBA in 2007.

References

External links

GBA
Calexico, California
Radio stations established in 1947
1947 establishments in California